Robert Walter Sperring (born October 10, 1949 in San Francisco, California) is a former professional baseball player who played for the Chicago Cubs from 1974 to 1976 and the Houston Astros in 1977. He was involved in a pair of transactions separated by  months of each other just before the start of the  season. He was traded along with Bill Madlock from the Cubs to the San Francisco Giants for Bobby Murcer, Steve Ontiveros and minor-league right-handed pitcher Andy Muhlstock on February 11. He never appeared in a regular-season game with the Giants who dealt him along with Willie Crawford to the Astros for Rob Andrews and cash during spring training on March 26.

References

External links

1949 births
Living people
Major League Baseball infielders
Chicago Cubs players
Houston Astros players
Pacific Tigers baseball players
Caldwell Cubs players
Charleston Charlies players
Quincy Cubs players
Midland Cubs players
Wichita Aeros players
Baseball players from San Francisco